El Paseo may refer to:

 El Paseo (Palm Desert, California), city
 El Paseo (Santa Barbara, California), complex of historic buildings in downtown Santa Barbara,
 El Paseo (film), a 2010 Colombian comedy film
 El Paseo Building, a two-story Spanish Eclectic building in Carmel-by-the-Sea, California
 El Paseo, a sculpture by Jo Mora

See also 
 Paseo (disambiguation)